American Review (Global Perspectives on US Affairs) was an online political magazine published twice a year by the United States Studies Centre at the University of Sydney in Australia. The magazine was established in 2006. As the magazine was based outside America, the emphasis was on a "fair and balanced" interpretation of American affairs with some focus on the US relationship with Australia and the Pacific region.

It ceased publishing new material in 2015.

References

External links
 

2006 establishments in Australia
2015 disestablishments in Australia
Biannual magazines published in Australia
Defunct political magazines published in Australia
Magazines established in 2006
Magazines disestablished in 2015
Magazines published in Sydney
Online magazines